All About Eve is a 2009 Philippine television drama series broadcast by GMA Network. The series is based on a 2000 South Korean television series of the same title. Directed by  Gil Tejada Jr., Mac Alejandre and Eric Quizon, it stars Sunshine Dizon in the title role and Iza Calzado. It premiered on March 9, 2009 on the network's Telebabad line up replacing Luna Mystika. The series concluded on June 5, 2009 with a total of 63 episodes. It was replaced by Adik Sa'Yo in its timeslot.

Cast and characters

Lead cast
Sunshine Dizon as Erika "Eve" Alegre Reyes
Iza Calzado as Nicole Gonzales

Supporting cast
Eula Valdez as Alma Bautista
Jean Garcia as Katrina Alegre
Mark Anthony Fernandez as Kenneth Villareal
Alfred Vargas as Warren Bautista
Richard Gomez as Frederico Gonzales
Celia Rodriguez as Concepcion Gonzales
Keempee de Leon as Paul
Eric Quizon as Robert Villareal
Angel Aquino as Judith Tebamo
Gabby Eigenmann as Max
Marky Lopez as Joel

Guest cast
Ian de Leon as Mando Reyes
Ina Raymundo as Lisa Cortez-Gonzales
Carmen Ronda as Luisa Villareal
Odette Khan as Warden Rita
Sandy Talag as young Erika
Chelsea Eugenio as young Nicole
JM Reyes as young Warren
Chariz Solomon as Jill
Mel Kimura as Cherry
Joanne Quintas as Nicole's co-worker
Jenny Miller as Nicole's co-worker
Micheal Roy Jornales as Robert's henchman

Ratings
According to AGB Nielsen Philippines' Mega Manila household television ratings, the pilot episode of All About Eve earned a 26.1% rating. While the final episode scored a 31.8% rating.

References

External links
 

2009 Philippine television series debuts
2009 Philippine television series endings
Filipino-language television shows
GMA Network drama series
Philippine television series based on South Korean television series
Television shows set in the Philippines